Carl Theodore Boles (October 31, 1934 – April 8, 2022) was an American professional baseball player whose career included seven years in minor league baseball, six in Japan, and a 19-game trial in the Major Leagues for the  San Francisco Giants. He attended the University of Arkansas at Pine Bluff (then known as Arkansas AM&N).

Boles was 27 years old and hitting .337 with 18 home runs in the Double-A Texas League when the Giants recalled him in August 1962. His 19 games with the Giants included four starts as the club's left fielder, 12 pinch hitting assignments and three games as a pinch runner. In the 1962 National League tie-breaker series against the Los Angeles Dodgers, Boles pinch-ran for Ed Bailey in the eighth inning of the second playoff game and scored the Giants' seventh and tying run in a game they eventually lost, 8–7. San Francisco, however, won the National League championship the next day.  In his two months with the Giants, Boles collected nine hits, all singles, and batted .375. He did not appear in the 1962 World Series, in which the Giants were defeated by the New York Yankees, four games to three.

During Boles' six years in Japanese baseball, he showcased his power hitting, with seasons of 26, 28 and 31 home runs. He retired in 1971.

References

External links
, or Retrosheet
Venezuelan Professional Baseball League statistics

1934 births
2022 deaths
African-American baseball players
American expatriate baseball players in Japan
Arkansas–Pine Bluff Golden Lions baseball players
Baseball players from Arkansas
Danville Dans players
El Paso Sun Kings players
Estrellas Orientales (VPBL) players
Eugene Emeralds players
Kintetsu Buffaloes players
Major League Baseball left fielders
Nishitetsu Lions players
People from Howard County, Arkansas
San Francisco Giants players
San Francisco Giants scouts
Springfield Giants players
Tacoma Giants players
21st-century African-American people
20th-century African-American sportspeople